This article displays the qualifying draw of the 2011 Barcelona Open Banco Sabadell.

Players

Seeds

Qualifiers

Lucky losers
  Rui Machado 
  Mischa Zverev

Qualifying draw

First qualifier

Second qualifier

Third qualifier

Fourth qualifier

Fifth qualifier

Sixth qualifier

Seventh qualifier

References
 Qualifying Draw

Singles Qualifying